Abram-Village is a rural municipality in Prince County, Prince Edward Island, Canada.

It is located in the township of Lot 15, approximately 27 kilometers west of the city of Summerside.

Located in the "Evangeline Region", a collection of Francophone Acadian communities in the central part of Prince County, Abram-Village is famous for its Acadian Festival during late August and early September.

The Commission scolaire de langue française, which administers the province's six French public schools, is headquartered in Abram-Village.

The community is home to the Western Red Wings of the Island Junior Hockey League.

History
The community is named after Abraham Arsenault, the first settler who came to the township in the 1820s.

Originally named "Abram's Village" it was officially renamed to "Abram-Village" on April 3, 2018.

Demographics 

References 

Communities in Prince County, Prince Edward Island
Rural municipalities in Prince Edward Island